Ihor Mykolayovych Yurchenko (born in 5/9/1960) is the Soviet and Ukrainian professional footballer known for his performance in the Ukrainian club Prykarpattia Ivano-Frankivsk. Ihor has a younger brother Mykola Yurchenko whose name is also tightly intertwined with the fate of the western Ukrainian club.

Playing career
He made his professional debut in the tournament for Spartak Ivano-Frankivsk in 1977. Throughout of his career played for different clubs of the Soviet Top League such as Shakhtar Donetsk, SKA Rostov-na-Donu, and Chornomorets Odessa. With the fall of the Soviet Union Yurchenko was on the roster of the football club Prykarpattia which was placed in the Ukrainian Premier League in 1992 after finishing second in the Soviet fourth division. He stayed with the club before its return to the Premiers after the 1994-95 season, becoming the playing coach for the team. Yurchenko soon after the club secured its place in the top league retired as a player continuing to coach the club from Ivano-Frankivsk. Later in his coaching career he managed Nyva Ternopil.

Honours
 Ukrainian First League champion.

References

External links
 Statistics of the player at KLISF 
 Protocol of one of the matches in 1993 between Prykarpattia and Podillya 
 Interview of Vasyl Teofan, the native of Ivano-Frankivsk Oblast and player of Metalist Kharkiv 
 Interview of Taras Kovalchuk, another native of Ivano-Frankivsk Oblast and player of the Ukrainian Olympic team 
 Interview of Taras Klym, the president of NFK Spartak Ivano-Frankivsk 
 

1960 births
Living people
Sportspeople from Ivano-Frankivsk
Soviet footballers
Ukrainian footballers
Ukrainian football managers
FC Shakhtar Donetsk players
FC Chornomorets Odesa players
Ukrainian Premier League players
Ukrainian First League players
Ukrainian Second League players
FC Spartak Ivano-Frankivsk managers
FC Nyva Ternopil managers
Ukrainian Premier League managers
Association football midfielders
FC SKA Rostov-on-Don players
FC Kalush managers